Shiv Brat Lal Varman, (1860-1939) popularly known by the honorifics "Data Dayal" (Merciful) and "Maharishi" (Great Sage), was born in Bhadohi district of Uttar Pradesh state in India in February 1860. He was a post graduate and a famous writer. It is believed that he wrote as many as 3,000 books on various social, historical, religious and spiritual topics. Being a famous writer he was called as the modern Maharishi Ved Vyas and hence became famous with the name Maharishi ji.

Writings
As an editor he moved to Lahore to edit the 'Arya Gazette' - an Urdu weekly. On 1 August 1907 he started his own magazine, Sadhu, and it acquired popularity very quickly. He became a famous writer and in his lifetime he edited and authored almost 3000 spiritual periodicals and books in Hindi, Urdu & English on various social, historical, religious and spiritual topics. His books Light of Anand Yoga, Dayal Yoga and Shabd Yoga became very famous. He sadly Died on February 23, 1939.

Lal's books on the Radha Soami spiritual movement include:
Light of Anand Yoga (English)
Dayal Yoga
Shabd Yoga
Radhaswami Yog: Part 1-6
Radhaswami Mat Parkash
Adbhut Upasana Yog: Part 1-2
Anmol Vichar
Dus Avtaron Ki Katha
Kabir Prichaya Adyagyan
Kabir Yog: Part 1-13
Kabir Bijak: Part 1-3
Karam Rahshya
Nanak Yog: Part 1-3
Panth Sandesh
Safalta Ke Sadhan
Sahaj Yog
Saptrishi Vartant
Sharanangati Yog
Satsang Ke Aath Vachan
Vayvahar Gyan Parkash
Vicharanjali
Vigyan Ramayana (Urdu)
Vigyan Krishnayana (Urdu)

Missionary

To spread the Radha Soami spiritual movement, Lal began a long journey from Lahore to Calcutta on 2 August 1911. He then left Calcutta, proceeding towards Rangoon by sea. He reached Penang on 31 October and Hong Kong on 22 November, via Singapore and Java. After that he went to Japan and later he went to San Francisco in America, where he delivered two lectures.

Ashram
In 1912 Lal founded his ashram in Gopi Ganj in Mirzapur, Uttar Pradesh, India. His discourses attracted seekers of the Radha Soami movement from all over the India and abroad. He left for the "Radha Swami Dham" on 23 February 1939 at the age of seventy-nine. His holy Samādhi stands at Radha Swami Dham, near Gopi Ganj.

Among those who continued his work was Baba Faqir Chand of Hoshiarpur and Param Sant Ram Singh Ji Arman of Jui, Haryana.

See also
 Bhagat Munshi Ram
 Manav Dayal I.C.Sharma
 Manavta Mandir
 Shiv Dayal Singh
 Rai Saligram
 Param Sant Kanwar Saheb
 Radha Swami Satsang, Dinod

External links
 Radha Swami Satsang, Dinod Official website

References

Sant Mat gurus
Surat Shabd Yoga
Spiritual teachers
1939 deaths
1860 births
People from Uttar Pradesh